Elisabeth Jenny Jeanne Maxwell (11 April 1921 – 7 August 2013) was a French-born researcher of the Holocaust who established the journal Holocaust and Genocide Studies in 1987. She was married to publishing tycoon Robert Maxwell from 1945 until his death in 1991 when the family soon came under scrutiny for his business dealings, especially his responsibility for the Mirror Group pension scandal. Later in life, she was recognized for her work as a proponent of Interfaith dialogue and received several awards including an honorary fellowship from the Woolf Institute at Cambridge.

Early life
Maxwell was born Elisabeth Jenny Jeanne Meynard in La Grive, near Saint-Alban-de-Roche, France, to Louis "Paul" Meynard and Colombe (née Petel) Meynard. Paul Meynard was a descendant of Protestant Huguenot aristocracy whose distant lineage included kings of France, while Colombe Meynard was a Roman Catholic whose marriage to a Protestant resulted in her excommunication.

Her father Paul owned a silk-weaving factory and was the mayor of the village. She had one sibling, an older sister, Yvonne.  Her parents sent her to England at age nine to attend the convent of Our Lady of Compassion at Acocks Green in Birmingham. In 1932, she returned to France. Meynard studied law at the Sorbonne.

Family 
In September 1944, after the Liberation of Paris, she met Czechoslovakian-born British Army Captain Robert Maxwell, while working as an interpreter for the Welcome Committee, which introduced French people to allied officers; they married on 15 March 1945. She then worked as his secretary and assistant in London as he established his publishing empire. The Maxwells had nine children: Michael, Philip, Ann, Christine, Isabel, Karine, Ian, Kevin and Ghislaine. All of Maxwell's children were delivered by her sister Yvonne, a gynecologist, in Maisons-Laffitte, France.  Two of the children died in childhood: daughter Karine died in 1957, at age three, from leukemia, and son Michael entered a coma following a car crash in 1961; he died six years later without regaining consciousness. At first, the family lived on a budget, but later moved into a mansion at Broomfield, Esher.  Starting in 1960, the family lived at Headington Hill Hall where the offices to Robert Maxwell's Pergamon Press were also located.

Education and career 
In her forties, Maxwell worked in public relations for her husband's company and campaigned for him in the general election of 1964; he was elected as the Labour MP for Buckingham. She then earned a BA degree in modern languages at St Hugh's College, Oxford.

In 1981, at the age of 60, Maxwell was awarded a PhD in French Literature from the University of Oxford for her thesis on The art of Letter Writing in France, 1789–1830. Her thesis work focused on researching a Protestant circle in Lyons.

Maxwell researched her husband's Jewish relatives who perished under Nazi rule, and discovered they amounted in total to over 300 of his immediate and extended family.

In 1988, Maxwell organized a conference in both Oxford and London, titled "Remembering for the Future". That same year, she received the Sir Sigmund Sternberg award for furthering Christian-Jewish relations.  Maxwell authored a book on antisemitism titled Silence or Speaking Out, published in 1990 by Southampton University.

In November 1991, Maxwell's husband, Robert, was found dead, floating in the waters off the Canary Islands near his yacht, the Lady Ghislaine. Following his mysterious death, evidence emerged that Robert Maxwell had plundered his employees' pension funds from the Mirror Group. Their sons, Ian and Kevin, were arrested on fraud charges in June 1992 but later acquitted in January 1996.

It is believed she knew nothing about the missing pension funds; she was left financially severely depleted after his death. Yehuda Bauer, a fellow Holocaust historian, stated that after Robert Maxwell's death "Elisabeth lost her pension, all her property, and only her children continued to support her. She was a wonderful person, kind and supportive, quite contrary to her husband, whom she loved despite everything."

Following the pension scandal, Maxwell reportedly left the UK and spent time at her chateau in France. She returned to Britain after the Duke of Westminster "let her a four-bedroomed townhouse at a peppercorn rent".

Maxwell's autobiography, entitled A Mind of My Own: My Life with Robert Maxwell, was published in November 1994. In a 1995 interview with The New York Times, she reflected on her marriage stating "The worst years of my life were 1981 to 1991. I was at his beck and call with no kudos, nothing was right. What saved me was my work on the Holocaust." In her seventies and early eighties, Maxwell travelled and lectured widely on Holocaust studies.

Maxwell was an editor for the book Remembering for the Future: the Holocaust in an Age of Genocide, a comprehensive work including the contributions of nearly 200 scholars, published in 2001. According to BBC News, Maxwell served as the executive chairman of the Remembering for the Future organization and was the opening speaker for the London conference Evil and Indifference: Is there an End to Genocide? held at Westminster Hall in July 2000. She was on the Executive Committee of the International Council of Christians and Jews and founded the International Conference on the Holocaust.

Maxwell was awarded an Honorary Fellowship from the Woolf Institute at Cambridge for her work to improve relations between Christians and Jews. She was further recognized with an Honorary Fellowship at Tel Aviv University, and the Anne Frank Institute's Eternal Flame Award.

Death 
In later life Maxwell spent most of her time in France with her sister Yvonne.  She died on 7 August 2013 at the age of 92 in Dordogne, France.

References

1921 births
2013 deaths
20th-century French people
21st-century French people
French expatriates in England
Alumni of St Hugh's College, Oxford
Historians of the Holocaust
French autobiographers
Book editors
French women academics
Women historians
Women academic administrators
French educators
French academic administrators
20th-century French educators
21st-century French educators
20th-century French writers
21st-century French writers
20th-century French women writers
21st-century French women writers
Maxwell family
20th-century women educators
21st-century women educators